Necessary or necessity may refer to: 

 Need
 An action somebody may feel they must do
 An important task or essential thing to do at a particular time or by a particular moment
 Necessary and sufficient condition, in logic, something that is a required condition for something else to be the case
 Necessary proposition, in logic, a statement about facts that is either unassailably true (tautology) or obviously false (contradiction)
 Metaphysical necessity, in philosophy, a truth which is true in all possible worlds
 Necessity in modal logic
 Necessity good in economics

Law
 Doctrine of necessity, a concept in constitutional law
 Military necessity, a concept in international law 
 Necessity (criminal law), a defence in criminal law
 Necessity (tort), a concept in the law of tort
 A necessity in contract law

Other
 , a poem by Letitia Elizabeth Landon being part of Three Extracts from the Diary of a Week, 1837.
 "Necessary" (song), by Every Little Thing, 1998
 A bathroom or toilet, in some languages (in English this is an archaic usage)
 An economic need enunciated by US President Franklin D. Roosevelt in his 1944 Second Bill of Rights
 Necessity (novel), of 2016 by Jo Walton
 Necessary Records, UK record label

See also

 
 
 
 
 Bare Necessities (disambiguation)